Glendogie Bogey is a stop motion animated short film created by BBC Scotland shown on BBC One Scotland in 2008. It is the sequel to the 2006 short film Haunted Hogmanay.

Plot
When Jeff's girlfriend Patricia is kidnapped by a monster called The Bogey, he and Thurston go to the caves underneath Glendogie golf course to rescue her.

Voice cast
 Peter Capaldi as Jeff Wylie
 Alex Norton as Thurston McCondry
 Rachel Stevens as Patricia Ravelston
 Cameron Fraser as The Bogey

BBC Television shows
Scottish television films
BBC Scotland television shows
British animated short films
British television films
2000s British films